The canton of Sablé-sur-Sarthe is an administrative division of the Sarthe department, northwestern France. Its borders were modified at the French canton reorganisation which came into effect in March 2015. Its seat is in Sablé-sur-Sarthe.

It consists of the following communes:
 
Asnières-sur-Vègre
Auvers-le-Hamon
Avoise
Le Bailleul
Courtillers
Dureil
Juigné-sur-Sarthe
Louailles
Parcé-sur-Sarthe
Notre-Dame-du-Pé
Pincé
Précigné
Sablé-sur-Sarthe
Solesmes
Souvigné-sur-Sarthe
Vion

References

Cantons of Sarthe